The First Battle of Cobadin, also known as the First Battle of the Rasova–Cobadin–Tuzla Line, was a battle fought from 17 to 19 of September 1916 between the Bulgarian Third Army and the Romanian–Russian Army of the Dobruja. The battle ended in Entente tactical victory and forced the Central Powers to hold their offensive and assume a defensive stance till the middle of October.

The right flank of the Allied forces was supported by the Romanian Navy's Danube Flotilla, consisting mainly of four Brătianu-class river monitors. These warships blocked with mines the river sectors of Silistra, Ostrov, and Gura Borcea, protected the 8 September evacuation of Silistra, attacked enemy land convoys, and destroyed enemy batteries.

See also
 Second Battle of Cobadin

References

Sources

 
 
 
 

Battles of World War I involving Romania
Battles of World War I involving Germany
Battles of World War I involving Bulgaria
Battles of World War I involving the Ottoman Empire
Battles of World War I involving Russia
Battles of the Balkans Theatre (World War I)
History of Dobruja
Conflicts in 1916
1916 in Bulgaria
1916 in Romania
Naval battles involving Romania
September 1916 events